Christchurch Hospital is run by the University Hospitals Dorset NHS Foundation Trust. It is located in Fairmile in Christchurch, Dorset, England. The hospital was managed by The Royal Bournemouth and Christchurch Hospitals NHS Foundation Trust until the merger with Poole Hospital NHS Foundation Trust on 1 October 2020.

History
The hospital has its origins in a workhouse infirmary built in 1882. New infirmary blocks were built at the north end of the site in 1913 and were used by the Red Cross during the First World War. The hospital joined the National Health Service in 1948 and, after the Royal Bournemouth Hospital opened in 1989, the site was rationalised and part of the site was sold for housing in 1995. It has subsequently developed as a centre for rehabilitation. The Secretary of State for Health, Alan Milburn, awarded the hospital's stroke service Beacon status in 2000. Various acute services were transferred from Christchurch Hospital to the Royal Bournemouth Hospital in 2010.

Services
An all-age rehabilitation service is available, though most patients are elderly. To support rehabilitation there are physiotherapy and occupational therapy facilities. There is a day hospital, a dermatology resource unit, rheumatology, and a Macmillan unit (palliative care).

Other hospitals in group
 Poole Hospital
 Royal Bournemouth Hospital

See also
 Healthcare in Dorset
 List of hospitals in England

References

Further reading

External links
 

Infrastructure completed in 1881
Christchurch, Dorset
Hospitals in Dorset
NHS hospitals in England
1881 establishments in England
Poor law infirmaries
Military hospitals in the United Kingdom
Teaching hospitals in England